Dora Messing Meyberg (November 19, 1869 – July 16, 1955) was very active in civic and club affairs, the first President of Hadassah Women's Zionist Organization of America.

Early life
Dora Messing was born on November 19, 1869, in Indianapolis, Indiana, the daughter of Rabbi Mayer Messing (1843–1930) and Rika Messing.

Career
She was very active in civic and club affairs. She was the first President of Hadassah Women's Zionist Organization of America; she was vice-president of B'nai B'rith Sisterhood. 

She was a member of the National Council of Jewish Women. She was also the president of the Music and Art Foundation.

Personal life
She moved to California and lived at 721 Irolo St., Los Angeles, California.

Dora Messing married Mitchel Scott Meyberg (1864–1944), attorney, and had three children: E. James (1890–1976), Leonard J. (1895–1976), Dorothy (1901–1983).

She died on July 16, 1955, and is buried at Forest Lawn Memorial Park (Glendale).

References

1869 births
1955 deaths
Burials at Forest Lawn Memorial Park (Glendale)
People from Indianapolis